Sharafat Ali Khan (1955  30 November 2009) was a Pakistani classical singer. He used to sing in various Hindustani classical genres such as thumri, kafi, khayal and ghazal throughout his career. The recipient of Saraswati Samman conferred by the government of India, he was also awarded Tamgha-e-Hunar award by Afghanistan.

Biography 
He was born to Ustad Salamat Ali Khan in Multan, Pakistan. Graduated from the Government College, Lahore (in modern-day Government College University, Lahore), he belonged to Sham Chaurasia gharana. He started his career during his childhood. He was the elder brother of Ustad Shafqat Ali Khan and nephew of Sakhawat Ali Khan and Ustad Nazakat Ali Khan (1920s–1984).

He was taught classical music by his father and participated around one hundred foreign music festivals. He also used to deliver lecturers on classical music at various uncertain universities.

Death 
He was suffering from diabetes mellitus and hypertension for over three months and died in late Monday on 30 November 2009 in Lahore, Pakistan and is buried at the Charagh Shah Wali shrine, a cemetery in Lahore where his parents, grandmother and his two uncles Ustad Nazakat Ali Khan and Ustad Zakir Ali Khan are also buried.

References

External links 
 Ustad Sharafat Ali Khan at Rekhta

1955 births
2009 deaths
Vocal gharanas
Pakistani ghazal singers
Pakistani classical singers
Recipients of the Saraswati Samman Award
Pakistani musicians
Singers from Lahore